Mi Hiyy Keekkuraanee? is a 2010 Maldivian romantic horror film written, produced and directed by Amjad Ibrahim. The film stars Mohamed Manik, Sheela Najeeb and Mohamed Shavin in pivotal roles.

Premise
Jennifer (Sheela Najeeb), a strange spirit in the disguise of a human being is on an avenging mission where she regularly meets three siblings; a shopkeeper, Sunil (Mohamed Manik), a taxi driver, Shahid (Mohamed Shavin) and their younger brother, Shiran (Hussain Solah). The siblings confess their feelings towards Jennifer. One night, when Shiran throws off his amulet on the order of Jennifer, he is mysteriously killed by her. However, after him being profoundly dead, Shiran is miraculously reincarnated.

Cast

Soundtrack

References

2009 films
Maldivian horror films
2009 horror films
Films directed by Amjad Ibrahim